Dylan Van Unen (born 22 June 1990) is a professional Australian rules footballer who played for the Essendon Football Club in the Australian Football League (AFL).

Van Unen was picked by Essendon with pick 51 of the 2012 National Draft. He made his debut against Fremantle in round 4 of the 2014 season.

Van Unen was delisted at the conclusion of the 2014 AFL season. He is of Lithuanian descent.

References

External links

1990 births
Living people
Australian people of Lithuanian descent
Australian rules footballers from Victoria (Australia)
Essendon Football Club players
Frankston Football Club players
Port Melbourne Football Club players